An election to Llanelli Borough Council was held in May 1991. It was preceded by the 1987 election and followed, as a result of local government reorganisation in Wales and the formation of unitary authorities, by the Carmarthenshire County Council election of 1995. On the same day there were elections to the other local authorities and community councils in Wales.

Overview
The Labour Party faced further losses as various other parties won seats throughout the borough, including the Green Party, which won seats for the first time.

Boundary changes
There were no boundary changes.

Results

Bigyn (three seats)

Burry Port (three seats)

Bynea (one seat)

Cross Hands (one seat)

Dafen (two seats)

Elli (two seats)

Felinfoel (one seat)

Glanymor (two seats)

Glyn (one seat)

Hendy (one seat)

Hengoed (two seats)

Kidwelly (one seat)

Llangennech (two seats)

Lliedi (two seats)

Llwynhendy (two seats)

Pembrey (one seat)

Pontyberem (one seat)

Swiss Valley (one seat)

Trimsaran (one seat)

Tumble (two seats)

Tycroes (one seat)

Tyisha (two seats)

References

1991
1991 Welsh local elections